John Ogden (February 12, 1824 – July 23, 1910) was an American military officer, minister, veteran educator, and abolitionist. He served in the Union Army during the American Civil War, being captured in 1864 and held prisoner until the conflict ended. He became an education official with the Freedmen's Bureau in Tennessee and co-founded a school for African Americans, Fisk School, that preceded Fisk University. He also served as the third North Dakota Superintendent of Public Instruction in the early 1890s.

Early life 
John Ogden was born on February 12, 1824 in Mount Vernon, Ohio. His family farmed. He was baptized as a Baptist.

Early teaching career 
Ogden began teaching at a common school in Crestline, Ohio in 1842. Throughout the 1840s he continued to teach in small schools until he was named principal of a grammar school in Columbus. From 1853 to 1855, he attended Ohio Wesleyan University and also served as an instructor there. In the early 1860s, he moved to Minnesota from Ohio and served as the founding principal of the Winona State Normal School (later known as Winona State University).

Military career 
Not long after arriving at Winona State Normal School, Ogden enlisted to fight in the American Civil War. He served in the 1st Wisconsin Cavalry Regiment. He received commissions as a second lieutenant, first lieutenant, and captain, but was captured by the Confederacy in 1864 and was held prisoner until the war ended. He was held as a prisoner or war in South Carolina and Georgia. At one point, he did escape but was recaptured.

Fisk University 
In 1865, Ogden joined with Erastus Milo Cravath and Edward Parmelee Smith of the American Missionary Association to create a school in Nashville for the education of men and women "irrespective of color". On January 9, 1866, they opened the Fisk School, named for Freedmen's Bureau official Clinton B. Fisk. Ogden served as the school's first principal, and on August 12, 1867, a charter was signed, transforming the institution into Fisk University.

Later career 
After serving as principal of Fisk School, and later president of Fisk University, Ogden moved back to Ohio. During the 1870s and early 1880s, he worked as principal for colleges and normal schools. Before moving to Dakota Territory, he lived in Washington, D.C. for a few years in the 1880s.

North Dakota 
In 1887, Ogden moved to Dakota Territory (modern-day North Dakota) and lived on a homestead in McIntosh County. He briefly served as the superintendent of schools in McIntosh County. He later moved to Sargent County and served as the principal of the Milnor State Normal School in Milnor, North Dakota.

In 1890, Ogden received the Republican nomination for Superintendent of Public Instruction over William J. Clapp. In 1891, he was elected North Dakota Superintendent of Public Instruction. He served a two-year term, ending in 1892, and did not seek reelection. Frederick W. Cathro stayed on with Ogden and served again as Deputy Superintendent of Public Instruction.

Later life 
Following his retirement in 1892, Ogden lived in Minneapolis. He moved to Seattle in 1907. He died there on July 23, 1910. He is buried at the Lake View Cemetery in Seattle.

Personal life 
In 1849, John Ogden married Mary Jane Mitchell in Ohio. They later divorced after the Civil War in the 1860s. In 1866, he married Anna Augusta Brewster, a former pupil at Winona State Normal School, in Saint Paul, Minnesota.

He wrote in 1869 to a publisher (Merriam) inquiring whether the gift of a dictionary was for him or Fisk University.

See also 
 List of North Dakota Superintendents of Public Instruction
 North Dakota Department of Public Instruction
 Fisk University
 Winona State University

References

Works cited 
 
 

Founders of schools in the United States
Fisk University faculty
1824 births
1910 deaths
People from Mount Vernon, Ohio
19th-century American educators
Schoolteachers from Ohio
American school principals
People of Ohio in the American Civil War
Baptists from Ohio
Presidents of Fisk University
Fisk University people
Schoolteachers from North Dakota
Educators from North Dakota
North Dakota Superintendents of Public Instruction